Robert H King is a former association football goalkeeper who represented New Zealand at international level.

King played three official A-international matches for New Zealand in 1948, all against visiting trans-Tasman neighbours Australia, the first a 0–6 loss on 14 August, followed by 0-7 and 1-8 losses on 28 August and 9 September respectively.

References 

Year of birth missing (living people)
Living people
New Zealand association footballers
New Zealand international footballers
Association football goalkeepers